The Real Thing is the third greatest hits compilation by the Australian singer songwriter Russell Morris. The album was released as a 2-CD album by Rouseabout Records in 2002. Disc 1, tracks 9-19 are his entire 1971 Bloodstone. The rest of the tracks cover his entire career.

It was released to coincide with the renewed interest in Morris' music, with the inclusion of "The Real Thing" and "Wings of an Eagle" on the soundtrack of the 2000 film, The Dish and the highly successful 2002 Australian tour of Long Way to the Top, in which Morris participated.

Review
Waterfront Records said, "Regarded as one of Australia's most enduring pop songwriters and singers. This amazing compilation brings together all of Russell's major songs from several albums and documents an incredible career. Comprehensive CD liner notes giving the lowdown on the songs and the remarkable history of an Australian contemporary music legend."

Track listing
 CD1
 "Hide & Seek" credited to Somebody's Image  (Doug Trevor, Martin Van Wyk) - 1:58
 "It's Only a Matter of Time" (Hans Poulsen) - 2:58
 "The Real Thing" (Johnny Young) - 6:12
 "Part Three into Paper Walls" (Russell Morris, Johnny Young) - 7:00
 "The Girl That I Love" (Johnny Young) - 4:36
 "Rachel" (Raymond Froggatt) - 4:27
 "Live With Friends" (Russell Morris, Brian Cadd) - 3:39
 "Alcohol Farm" (Russell Morris) - 3:20
 "O Helly" - (Russell Morris) - 2:41
 "Jail Jonah's Daughter" - (Russell Morris) - 3:03
 "Saints and Sinners" - (Russell Morris)
 "Our Hero Is Dead" - (Russell Morris)
 "Heaven Shines" - (Russell Morris)
 "The Cell" - (Russell Morris)
 "The Gambler's Lament" - (Russell Morris)
 "Goodbye" - (Russell Morris)
 "Ride Your Chariot" - (Russell Morris)
 "Lay In The Graveyard" - (Russell Morris)
 "Sweet, Sweet Love" - (Russell Morris) - 4:19

 CD2
 "Wings of an Eagle" (Russell Morris) - 3:57
 "Blue Eyed Girl" (Russell Morris) - 3:31
 "Don't Rock the Boat" (Russell Morris) - 3:03
 "I Remember When" (Russell Morris) - 3:07
 "Broken Egg Shells" (Russell Morris) - 4:26
 "Running Jumping Standing Still" (Russell Morris) 3:27
 "Cloudy Day" (Russell Morris) - 4:03
 "Thunder Ground" - 4:30
 "Hush" (Joe South) - 3:00 
 "In The Heat Of The Night" credited to Russell Morris And The Rubes  - 3:42
 "The Roar Of The Wild Torpedoes" credited to Russell Morris And The Rubes - 3:12
 "Hot Love" credited to Russell Morris Band 
 "Doctor in the House" credited to Russell Morris Band 
 "A Thousand Suns"	
 "Tartan Lines" 	
 "Stay With You"
 "One Star"  credited to Burns, Cotton & Morris
 "If This Is Love"  credited to Burns, Cotton & Morris
 "After The Goldfish"  credited to Burns, Cotton & Morris

References

External links
 

2002 greatest hits albums
Russell Morris albums
Compilation albums by Australian artists
Albums produced by Peter Dawkins (musician)